Mihail Korsunov (born February 1, 1963), also known as Mikhail Korshunov, is a Russian-born Estonian former professional ice hockey forward.

Career

He then moved to Finland, playing in the 1. Divisioona for FoPS and Imatran Ketterä before returning to Russia in 1995, playing in the second-tier Vysshaya Liga for HC Lipetsk. He would return to Estonia a year later, playing i  their top-level Meistriliiga for Kreenholm/Narva 2000 and Kohtla-Järve Central. From 1997 to 2001, Korsunov would finish his career in Finland, playing one season for KooKoo and three season with  before retiring as a player. He later became an assistant coach for KooKoo's junior teams.

Internationally, Korsunov began playing for the Soviet Union, representing them in the 1981 U18 European Junior Championship. He then switched to play for Estonia in 1994. With Estonia, he played in five Ice Hockey World Championships and helped them win two promotions, in 1994 from Pool C2 to Pool C and again to Pool B in 1997.

References

External links

1963 births
Estonian ice hockey forwards
FoPS players
Imatran Ketterä players
KooKoo players
Krylya Sovetov Moscow players
Living people
Russian ice hockey forwards
Ice hockey people from Moscow
Soviet ice hockey forwards
Estonian expatriate sportspeople in Finland
Expatriate ice hockey players in Finland
Estonian expatriate ice hockey people
Russian expatriate sportspeople in Finland
Russian expatriate ice hockey people